Frederick Charles Lester (20 February 1911 – 28 July 1974) was an English footballer who played professionally for Gillingham and Sheffield Wednesday. He made over 200 Football League appearances for the former club.

References

1911 births
1974 deaths
People from Rochester, Kent
English footballers
Association football fullbacks
Chatham Town F.C. players
Gillingham F.C. players
Sheffield Wednesday F.C. players
English Football League players
Brentford F.C. wartime guest players